Hegyeshalom is a village of approximately 3600 inhabitants in Győr-Moson-Sopron County, Hungary, on the border with Austria and less than 15 km from the border with Slovakia.

History 
A charter given by Andrew II of Hungary in 1217 mentions the settlement as Hegelshalm. After the Ottoman wars, the town was settled by German Jewish settlers.  They were exterminated during the latter part of WW2. The name of Hegyeshalom is from the two Hungarian words = hegyes + halom. The word "hegyes" means "mountainous" (or "piked") and the word "halom" means "pile" (or "hill").

Border crossing

Until 21 December 2007, at 00:00 CET, Hegyeshalom was an important border crossing and control point between Austria, Slovakia and Hungary. However, all border controls ceased at that time as Hungary as well as Slovakia joined the Schengen Area.

The Hungarian M1 motorway passes through Hegyeshalom. It connects with Austria's A4 motorway across the border at Nickelsdorf.

Hegyeshalom is also a railway border crossing point along the main railway line between Vienna and Budapest and the railway line to Bratislava. The station has a plinthed MÁV Class 411 steam locomotive.

Sightseeing
The romanesque church was built in the Árpád age. The 13th century church was renewed in gothic style in the 15th century. On the eastern side stands the gothic tower with eightfold basic walls, while the upper part of it is fourfold, built in the 18th century.

Famous people
 In 1921 Zénó Terplán professor of the University of Technology in Budapest was born here.

Gallery

External links

  in Hungarian
 Street map 
 Hegyeshalom on the Vendégváró homepage
 Aerial photographs of Hegyeshalom
 Full Info on HU.Wikipedia
 Google Earth view: flat country of the Pannonian Plain a bit west of Hegyeshalom.

Populated places in Győr-Moson-Sopron County
Romanesque architecture in Hungary
Austria–Hungary border crossings